"Radio Heart" is the second single from The Futureheads' third album This Is Not the World. It was released on 19 May 2008 in the United Kingdom and reached #65 on the UK Singles Chart and #1 in the UK Indie Chart. The song was featured in the 2009 videogame Colin McRae: Dirt 2.

Track listing
CD
 "Radio Heart"
 "Charity Shop"
7" #1
 "Radio Heart"
 "Invasion!"

7" #2
 "Radio Heart"
 "Radio Heart (Live)"

2008 singles
The Futureheads songs
2008 songs
Songs written by Ross Millard